You Don't Know Jack is an American game show based on the video game series of the same name. it aired on ABC in 2001. Paul Reubens played host Troy Stevens. Tom Gottlieb reprised his role as Cookie Masterson, who was the announcer. The show lasted six episodes.

Development
The franchise of You Don't Know Jack began with popular CD-ROM based quiz games for computers in 1996. Development had begun in 1997, but was halted for several years as Paul Reubens, whom the developers selected as host, was uncertain about accepting a role outside his most well-known character Pee-Wee Herman. Despite this reluctance, he ultimately agreed to do the show, and production began in 2001.

Format
Three contestants competed for the first three rounds, with only two going on to the final "Jack Attack" round.

Round One
In Round One, Stevens asked a series of questions, usually worth $1,000, although some opening questions were asked for lower amounts. Most questions were multiple choice (like the computer game), but some were simply open-ended questions with no choices. The player who signaled in and got the question correct won the money. (Unlike the computer game, an incorrect answer to a question did not lose money except for the "DisOrDat" and the "Jack Attack" rounds as described below.)

After up to three questions were played, round one ended with a mini-round called the "DisOrDat", which had a similar format to the computer game.  Stevens gave the players a clue and the contestants had to choose one of the two possible answers or occasionally both.  Correct answers were still worth $1,000. If any player gave an incorrect answer, the others could not steal; also, in the DisOrDat, a player giving a wrong answer had $1,000 taken away.

Round Two
Round Two was the same as Round One, but with dollar values doubled. Round Two ended with a feature called "The $2,000,000 Question". The question's value would start at $2,000,000 and decreased rapidly over time, starting from the moment Stevens began to read. While he was doing so, a lengthy distraction would occur, such as Stevens being attacked by ninjas, setting the question card on fire, or fighting for possession of the card with a dog. During this time, the value continued to decrease; it would typically be under $200 when he finally finished reading the question. Whoever eventually answered the question correctly won the remaining money.

Round Three
Round three featured questions worth $3,000 apiece. Always popping up in this round was a question worth $3,000 under the category of "Things That Sound Dirty but Aren't."

For the final question of the round, worth $5,000, the players on either end of the row put up an opaque partition between themselves and the center player. Then all three contestants were asked a math question involving several elements of pop culture and fact, performing the operations in the order they appeared in the question: for instance, the unit number on M*A*S*H added to the number of digits in a U.S. Social Security number, minus the number of Beatles on the cover of The White Album, and the result divided by the number represented by a roll of "snake eyes"; the answer would be (4077 + 9 - 0) / 2 = 2043. They had 30 seconds to solve the problem using a dry-erase board and marker; during their thinking time, they would be distracted by such things as a crying baby, a mariachi band, and children poorly playing Twinkle, Twinkle, Little Star on violins. At the end of the round, the partitions were removed, and the correct answer was revealed by Stevens. The players then revealed their answers, usually in high-to-low score order. Any player answering correctly earned $5,000.  At the end of this question, the two higher scorers moved onto the "Jack Attack". In an event of a tie for second place, one more "Sudden Death"-style question is read to the tied players. The first to signal in is the only one to give a response. If they answer correctly, they move on; if they fail, their opponent will move on. The eliminated player received a consolation prize; this player would usually be seen on camera disappearing via a CGI effect (often exploding in a cloud of flames).

Jack Attack (Round Four)
Round Four was called the Jack Attack.  It was played between the two remaining contestants.  Stevens' head would pop up on the screen as both a comical sight and a possible distraction.  The players were given a category and a series of clues. A series of answers then flew onto the screen. When an answer that fit both the category and the clue appeared on the screen, the players would buzz in and call out the answer. Correct answers were worth $5,000, but every incorrect answer given deducted $5,000 from the player's score.  After six questions, the player with the higher score won the game and kept their money, while the other player received a consolation prize.

Critical reception
The show received a mixed review from Tom Jicha of the South Florida Sun Setinel, who wrote, "The goal is clearly summertime fun, and Jack hits the mark. Nevertheless, it's hard to imagine a show so slight becoming this off-season's Millionaire or even impressing enough to win a berth in the regular season lineup. Then again, critics sometimes don't know jack."

References

External links
 

2001 American television series debuts
2001 American television series endings
2000s American comedy game shows
American Broadcasting Company original programming
Television series by Carsey-Werner Productions
American television shows based on video games
English-language television shows
You Don't Know Jack (franchise)